Girmay Hadish Zahilay (born May 6, 1987) is an American politician and lawyer who is a member of the King County Council from District 2 in Seattle, Washington. He was elected in 2019, defeating longtime incumbent Larry Gossett.

Early life and education

Zahilay and his brother were born in Sudan to Ethiopian refugees from Tigray who had escaped military conflict. He was three years old when his family immigrated to the United States, settling in the Rainier Valley. Zahilay moved between public housing arrangements in several neighborhoods in South Seattle, including the International District and Skyway, while his mother Abie worked double shifts as a nursing assistant. The family also stayed at a homeless shelter in Downtown Seattle between moves to public housing in NewHolly and Rainier Vista.

He graduated from Franklin High School in Seattle and was a research intern at the University of Washington Department of Biology. He majored in biology at Stanford University, where he served as president of the Black Student Union. Zahilay earned a J.D. degree from the University of Pennsylvania and worked as an intern at the Office of the White House Counsel during the Obama administration.

Career

Zahilay worked for the Congressional Hunger Center and New York City Coalition Against Hunger as a community organizer after graduating from college. He then moved to jobs at law firms Skadden Arps in New York and Perkins Coie in Seattle. Zahilay also founded a non-profit, Rising Leaders, that aims to provide mentors for underserved middle school students.

He announced his County Council District 2 campaign in February 2019, becoming the first challenger to six-term incumbent Larry Gossett since 2005. Zahilay campaigned on the expansion of public housing and the replacement of youth incarceration with other methods. Gossett, who had also attended Franklin High School and had led his own Black Student Union at the University of Washington, trailed Zahilay in the primary election by a 37 percent margin. Zahilay defeated Gossett in the November 2019 general election, becoming the youngest member of the King County Council. He was sworn in to represent District 2 on January 8, 2020, and was selected to chair the council's Law and Justice Committee.

Council tenure
During his first year in office, Zahilay commented on the weight of being the only sitting Black county council member in Washington state and his efforts to connect with the youth in his district by visiting several Zoom elementary classrooms. In response to the COVID-19 pandemic, his office organized multiple events to hand out free masks and Personal Protective Equipment (PPE) in areas of his district that were disproportionally impacted by the pandemic. Zahilay supported multiple county level ballot measures that applied changes to the role of the county sheriff in response to the George Floyd protests.

References

Living people
American people of Ethiopian descent
Politicians from Seattle
King County Councillors
African-American people in Washington (state) politics
Washington (state) Democrats
Stanford University alumni
University of Pennsylvania Law School alumni
1987 births
Skadden, Arps, Slate, Meagher & Flom people
People associated with Perkins Coie
Franklin High School (Seattle) alumni
21st-century African-American politicians
21st-century American politicians
20th-century African-American people